Laureate is a public art work by American artist Seymour Lipton, located on the Riverwalk in downtown Milwaukee, Wisconsin. The abstract artwork was commissioned by the Allen-Bradley Company in memory of Harry Lynde Bradley and as an enhancement for the newly constructed Performing Arts Center. It is located on the east bank of the Milwaukee River at 929 North Water Street.

References

1969 sculptures
Nickel sculptures
Outdoor sculptures in Milwaukee